Peter J. Hansen is an American animal scientist and physiologist who serves as distinguished professor and L.E. "Red" Professor of Animal Sciences in the Department of Animal Sciences at University of Florida

Research
Hansen's interest in livestock species started early in life while staying with relatives in County Wexford Ireland   He first did research while an undergraduate in the Dept. of Dairy Science at the University of Illinois under the tutelage of Charles E. Graves. His doctoral research focused on regulation of reproduction by photoperiod in cattle and mice. Postdoctoral work with Roberts and Bazer kindled a love for understanding the establishment and maintenance of pregnancy, which subsequently became a career-long research interest.  Among the most notable achievements as a faculty member at Florida has been identifying embryokines (see embryokine) that regulate development of the preimplantation embryo, demonstrating sex-dependent developmental programming during the preimplantation period, understanding how elevated temperature compromises reproduction, development of embryo transfer to increase pregnancy rate in heat-stressed cows, demonstration of the importance of the slick mutation in the prolactin receptor gene for increasing thermotolerance of cattle, and characterization of mechanisms for inhibition of uterine immune function by progesterone.

Notable Awards 
Hansen was the recipient of the highest awards given by the American Society of Reproductive Immunology and American Dairy Science Association. He is a Fellow of the American Association for the Advancement of Science (2007),American Dairy Science Association (2009), American Society of Animal Science (2018)  and the Society for the Study of Reproduction (2021)

Selected publications

References

External links 
 

Living people
1956 births
21st-century American scientists
20th-century American biologists
21st-century biologists
American physiologists
Scientists from Oak Park, Illinois
University of Illinois College of Agriculture, Consumer, and Environmental Sciences alumni
University of Wisconsin–Madison alumni
University of Florida faculty
Fellows of the American Association for the Advancement of Science